Hector Luis García Mora (born 1 November 1991) is a Dominican professional boxer who has held the WBA super featherweight title since August 2022. As of November 2022, he is ranked as the second best active super featherweight by The Ring magazine.

He competed at the 2016 Summer Olympics in the men's bantamweight event, in which he was eliminated in the round of 32 by Dzmitry Asanau.

Professional boxing career

Early career
Garcia made his professional debut against Marlembron Acuna on 16 December 2016. He won the fight by a third-round stoppage. Garcia made his first step up in competition on 10 November 2018, when he was booked to face Robin Zamora for the vacant WBA Fedelatin featherweight title. He won the fight by a second-round knockout. Garcia made his first WBA Fedelatin featherweight title defense against Anvar Yunusov on 27 July 2019. He won the fight by split decision, with scores of 105–103, 107–101 and 102–106.

Following a pair of victories against Miguel Moreno Gonzalez and Isaac Avelar, Garcia was booked to face Chris Colbert on 26 February 2022, in a WBA super featherweight title eliminator, as a late replacement for Roger Gutiérrez who withdrew as he tested positive for COVID-19. Garcia won the fight by an upset unanimous decision, knocking Colbert down in the seventh round and winning a unanimous decision with judges' scorecards of 119–108 and 118–109 twice.

WBA super featherweight champion

García vs. Gutiérrez
García was expected to challenge the reigning WBA super featherweight champion Roger Gutiérrez on July 10, 2022, at the Poliedro de Caracas in Caracas, Venezuela. The fight was later postponed, as the promoters were unable to organize a bout in Venezuela. The WBA ordered both sides to renegotiate terms to avoid the fight heading to a purse bid hearing. The pair came to terms and rescheduled the fight for August 20. The bout took place on the Adrien Broner and Omar Figueroa Jr. undercard. García fought behind his jab for the first eight rounds of the bout, which kept his opponent relatively inactive. Although Gutiérrez picked up the pace in the ninth round, García had already built up a significant lead and won the fight by unanimous decision. Two judges scored the fight 117–111 in his favor, while the third judge scored the fight 118–110 for García.

García vs. Davis
García faced three weight world champion Gervonta Davis in a lightweight bout at the at Capital One Arena in Washington, D.C. on January 7, 2023. The fight was a closely-contested affair, until Davis landed a flush straight left early in the eighth round. Soon after, a fight broke out in the crowd at ringside with 2 minutes and 8 seconds left in the eighth round, causing the fight to be temporarily halted. When the action was resumed, Davis found success again with his left hand, visibly hurting García. The latter was disoriented after retreating to his stool in his corner, complaining about his eyesight. The fight was stopped, with Davis winning via eighth-round corner retirement. Marking this the first loss of Garcia's career.

Professional boxing record

See also
List of world super-featherweight boxing champions

References

External links

1991 births
Living people
Dominican Republic male boxers
Olympic boxers of the Dominican Republic
Boxers at the 2016 Summer Olympics
Pan American Games medalists in boxing
Pan American Games silver medalists for the Dominican Republic
Boxers at the 2015 Pan American Games
Medalists at the 2015 Pan American Games
Featherweight boxers
World super-featherweight boxing champions
World Boxing Association champions
20th-century Dominican Republic people
21st-century Dominican Republic people